Evelyne Brochu (born November 17, 1982) is a Canadian actress. In 2013, she became well known for her English-speaking role as Delphine Cormier, a French scientist on the hit Canadian science fiction thriller TV series Orphan Black.

Early life
Brochu grew up in Pointe-Claire, a suburb of Montreal, Quebec. Her native language is French, but she also spoke English from an early age. Growing up she had anglophone friends and learned English at Jean XXIII High School in Dorval, Quebec. She studied drama at the Cégep de Saint-Laurent. In 2005, Brochu graduated from the Conservatoire d'art dramatique in Montreal.

She says a key turning point in learning English was when she became an avid viewer of The Fresh Prince of Bel-Air as a child. Her father left when she was  years old and, when her father later remarried, she found herself with a step-sister. Brochu has stated that she has a good relationship with her stepmother. Her mother is a violoncello teacher and her father worked as a taxi driver.

While out cycling, she was hit by a truck and was told by her doctors that to keep her knee in good shape she could no longer run or dance. She stopped both and took up yoga and acting.

Career 
Some of her most prominent French-speaking roles include: Chloé in Inch'Allah, Rose in Café de Flore, Sara in Tom at the Farm, and Stéphanie in Polytechnique.
In 2013, she became well known for her English-speaking role as Delphine Cormier, a French scientist on the hit TV series Orphan Black.

Brochu has recently finished portraying Aurora Luft in CBC Television's spy thriller X Company.

Brochu also has a successful singing career. She released a duet with Félix Dyotte entitled "C'est l'été, c'est l'été, c'est l'été", in 2016, as well as appearing on Dyotte's 2017 album Politesses on the song "Je cours", and has released a solo single entitled "Quoi".

In September 2019 Brochu, in cooperation with Dyotte, released her first music album called Objets Perdus. In 2020, Dyotte won the SOCAN Songwriting Prize in the French category for the album's single "Maintenant ou jamais".

Personal life

She previously dated Canadian actor François Arnaud, however in a May 2014 interview she stated that they were no longer together. Her cousin is Xarah Dion, a French-Canadian singer.

In February 2015, Brochu stated in an interview that she is a feminist and that she struggled when portraying Aurora Luft in X Company:There was a moment in Episode 2 when I was with [co-star Dustin Milligan], when I have to give him orders, I don’t want to do that, and he doesn’t want me to do that, and my first instinct, as a woman, was to smooth it out for him. The director was like, no, you’re a sergeant now. You have to give orders. You have authority. I'm a feminist, it’s 2015. She resides in Montreal, Quebec.

Brochu is fluent in English and French but can also speak Spanish well. She can perform contemporary dance and yoga. Brochu also has musical talents which include being able to play the drums, guitar and piano as well as singing mezzo-soprano and alto.

In June 2018, she confirmed her pregnancy with a picture on her Instagram account with her boyfriend Nicolas Schirmer. Their son, Laurier, was born on October 6, 2018. In August 2020, she revealed to be pregnant with twins. She confirmed the birth of the twins, Camille and Matthias, on Instagram on November 16.

Filmography

Television

Film

Theatre

Awards and nominations

Music

Studio albums

Singles

Videography

References

External links
 

1982 births
Living people
Actresses from Quebec City
Canadian women pop singers
Canadian feminists
Canadian film actresses
Canadian stage actresses
Canadian television actresses
Conservatoire de musique du Québec à Montréal alumni
French-language singers of Canada
Musicians from Quebec City
Singers from Quebec
21st-century Canadian actresses
21st-century Canadian women singers